Nyceryx fernandezi is a moth of the  family Sphingidae. It is known from Venezuela.

References

Nyceryx
Moths described in 1999